Uche Okafor (born 10 February 1991) is a Nigerian football goalkeeper currently playing for Enugu Rangers.

International career 
Okafor represented Nigeria national under-17 football team at the 2007 U-17 World Cup in South Korea and played one game on the world championship team. He represented the Flying Eagles at 2009 African Youth Championship in Rwanda at the 2009 U-20 World Cup.

Titles 
2007 FIFA U-17 World Cup - Winner

References 

1991 births
Living people
Igbo sportspeople
Nigerian footballers
Nigeria under-20 international footballers
Association football goalkeepers
Kaduna United F.C. players